The Hikiä railway station is located in Hausjärvi, Finland, in the village and urban area of Hikiä. It is located along the Riihimäki–Lahti line, and its neighboring stations are Riihimäki in the west and Oitti in the east.

History 

Hikiä is the one of the original intermediate stations of the Riihimäki–Saint Petersburg railway, and was opened for passenger traffic in November 1869. It was placed on the crossing between the railway and the road between Nurmijärvi and the church of Hausjärvi. The railway played a significant role in the development of Hikiä, helping it overtake the Hausjärvi church village in population. In 1960 Hikiä had 700 inhabitants, compared to 200 of the Hausjärvi church village. Hikiä's population in 2018 was 1,068.

Hikiä became an unmanned station in 1976 and its freight traffic was abolished in 1991.

Architecture 
The station building in Hikiä was built according to stock plans for class IV stations on the Riihimäki–St. Petersburg line, designed by Knut Nylander.  Construction was completed in 1869, and the building was later expanded in two phases in 1883 and 1904, using the same plans drawn by Bruno Granholm for the extensions of the Lappila station in 1876 and 1900. As per a railyard diagram dating to 1873, the Hikiä station at the time also included a warehouse and a water tower at the end of a siding stretching from the far eastern end from the railyard, as well as two additional sidings to its south.

The Hikiä station and its related buildings were transferred into the possession of Senate Properties in 2007.

Services 

Hikiä is an intermediate station on VR commuter rail line  on the route Riihimäki–Lahti. Westbound trains towards Riihimäki stop at track 1 and eastbound ones towards Lahti use track 2. Prior to the opening of the Kerava-Lahti railway line, Hikiä was also served by the unnamed regional trains on the route Helsinki–Riihimäki–Lahti–Kouvola–Kotka Harbour.

External links 
 Train departures and arrivals at Hikiä on Fintraffic

Notes

References 

Hausjärvi
Knut Nylander railway stations
Railway stations opened in 1869
Railway stations in Kanta-Häme